The 23rd International Emmy Awards took place on November 20, 1995 in New York City and hosted by English actor Peter Ustinov. The award ceremony, presented by the International Academy of Television Arts and Sciences (IATAS), honors all programming produced and originally aired outside the United States.

Ceremony
The nominees for the 23rd International Emmy Awards were announced on November 1, 1995, by the International Academy of Television Arts and Sciences. The awards honor programs produced and initially aired outside the United States, as well as independent productions. The award ceremony took place on November 20, 1995 in New York City.

Don Hewitt, executive producer of CBS News' 60 Minutes, will receive the Founder's Emmy for recognition of work that spans geographic and cultural boundaries; and John Birt, Director General of the BBC, was honored with the Board's Directorate Emmy.

Broadcast
The awards ceremony was seen overseas via NBC SuperChannel and NBC Asia.

Winners

References

External links 
 23rd Annual International Emmys Gala Awards (1995)

International Emmy Awards ceremonies
International
International